Jacques Bunel may refer to:

Jacob Bunel (1568–1614), French painter 
Père Jacques (1900–1945), French priest, victim of the Nazis